MoonDreamers is an American animated television series that aired in 1986 as part of the My Little Pony 'n Friends lineup.

My Little Pony aired the first 15 minutes and the second half rotated among MoonDreamers, Potato Head Kids and The Glo Friends, all of which promoted toys from Hasbro.

Plot
The Moondreamers are a group of celestial people who create and deliver pleasant dreams to Earth children. Their main enemy is the evil Queen Scowlene who attempts to keep everyone awake at night with her nightmare crystals.

Characters
 Crystal Star (voiced by Tress MacNeille) - The main protagonist of the series, who leads the Moondreamers and designs the stars.
 Whimzee - (voiced by B.J. Ward) - A Moondreamer who uses her imagination to create dreams for Dreamcasting.
 Celeste - Her job is to ride on Galaxia and bring nighttime to earth so that dreams can begin to be sent out.
 Galaxia - Celeste's magical space dragon with feather-like wings.
 Sparky Dreamer - A brainy MoonDreamer who is often stuck fixing the mistakes of the other Moondreamers.
 Dream Gazer (voiced by Jennifer Darling) - The eldest MoonDreamer, she is considerably older than the other members and is the wisest. She has a star tattooed over her left eye and has a very wistful voice. She stirs all the different ingredients that make dreams into a secret recipe called the imagination combination.
 Bucky Buckaroo - A Moondreamer who takes the dream crystals to the stars on his favourite comet, Halley. In "Bucky's Comet", he's shown to have a crush on Crystal.
 Blinky and Bitsy (voiced by Robin Kaufman and Elizabeth Lyn Fraser) - Two little Moondreamers in training, they are young girls who want to help the Moondreamers, but often get in the way. Blinky is quite outgoing while Bitsy is shown to be very shy.
Ursa Major (voiced by Tress MacNeille) - A flying polar bear who is Blinky's companion.
 Roary (voiced by Neil Ross) - A flying lion who is Bitsy's companion.
 Frolic - A Starfinder who explores the uncharted universe. He is accompanied by a peacock named Fluffin.
 Stardust - A Starfinder who looks for lonely planets that need stars. He is accompanied by a ram named Hornsby.
 Dawn - A Sunfinder who searches for the sun to start the morning. He is accompanied by a rabbit named Bunnyhop.
 Dusky - A Sunfinder who places the sun at the spot where it is supposed to set. He is accompanied by a dog named Sunscout.
 Sundazzle - A Sunsparkler who polishes the sun.
 Fundreamer - A Sunsparkler who creates happy dreams for children.
 Daystar - A Sunsparkler who supervises every sunny day.
 Cloudpuff - A Sunsparkler who makes the designs of the clouds.
 Ursa Minor - Ursa Major's mischievous niece.

Villains
 Queen Scowlene (voiced by Tress MacNeille) - The primary antagonist of the series who lives in Monstrous Middle. She is the mother of Scowlette. Scowlene hasn't slept a wink and has plans to take over Starry Up so that she could keep everyone up at night. In "The Poobah of Pontoon," it is revealed that Scowlene's older brother is the Poobah of Pontoon making him Scowlette's uncle.
 Princess Scowlette - The daughter of Queen Scowlene, who seems to be about the same age as Whimzee and lives with her mother. She often tries to destroy the Moondreamers in order to impress her mother, though it never works out. 
 Professor Grimace (voiced by Clive Revill) - A mad scientist who helps Queen Scowlene with her plans by inventing machines that would go horribly wrong.
Igon (voiced by Peter Cullen) - A three-legged troll-like creature who acts as Professor Grimace's lab assistant.
 Sleep Creeps - The minions of Queen Scowlene.
Shiner - A Sleep Creep who wakes children with his flashlight.
 Creaky - A Sleep Creep who fills the night with creaks and groans.
 Squawker (voiced by Tress MacNeille) - A Sleep Creep who makes loud noises that keep people awake.

Episodes

Cast
 Adam Carl - 
 Peter Cullen - Igon
 Jennifer Darling - Dream Gazer
 Elizabeth Lyn Fraser - Bitsy
 Melanie Gaffin - Ursa Minor
 Liz Georges - 
 Renae Jacobs - 
 Robin Kaufman - Blinky
 Tress MacNeille - Crystal Starr, Queen Scowlene, Squawker, Ursa Major
 Terence McGovern - 
 Clive Revill - Professor Grimace
 Neil Ross - Roary
 Ken Sansom - 
 Judy Strangis -

Crew
 Ginny McSwain - Voice Director
 Mason Alan Dinehart - Voice Director

Reception
MoonDreamers was not a successful series. In 2014, io9 listed it among twelve 1980s cartoons that "don't deserve to be remembered at all, let alone fondly.", as for the other 3, io9 was harsh at them calling mlp and friends "a travesty on the haters invasion strike."

References

External links

 Moondreamers on MyLittleWiki
 Moondreamers Identification Page
 Moondust4Moondreamers
 
 

1986 American television series debuts
1987 American television series endings
1980s toys
1980s American animated television series
American children's animated fantasy television series
Television series by Hasbro Studios
The Family Channel (American TV network, founded 1990) original programming
Television series by Sunbow Entertainment
Television series by Marvel Productions
Television series by Claster Television